John Thomas Biggs (1847–1929), best known as J. T. Biggs was a British sanitary engineer and anti-vaccinationist.

Biggs worked as a sanitary and waterworks engineer. Biggs was a member of the Leicester Board of Guardians. During the smallpox epidemic of 1871–1873 he studied the outbreak and came to the conclusion that  vaccination was inefficient to prevent disease. He was a notable figure in the anti-vaccination movement in Leicester. He opposed compulsory vaccination and became the Secretary of the Leicester Anti-Vaccination League in 1870. He was the main organizer of a popular anti-vaccination demonstration that took place on 23 March 1885 outside Leicester Temperance Hall in which the whole practice of vaccination was condemned. It became known as the "Great Leicester Demonstration" with an estimated 80,000 protestors that gathered in the marketplace with anti-vaccination banners.

Biggs gave evidence against vaccination to the Royal Commission which was set up to investigate the efficacy of vaccination against smallpox. Biggs testified to the Royal Commission that an anti-vaccination prisoner had been thrown into a "black hole" and made to suffer "every possible degradation". He also stated that a child had caught "a sort of foot-and-mouth disease" from calf-lymph vaccination. Biggs answered 3000 questions and produced 51 statistical tables and 15 diagrams. An error in the official figures during his cross-examination caused a recalculation of his data which took a further two years. To the disappointment of Biggs the 1896 Report of the Commission supported the continuation of compulsory vaccination as protective against smallpox.

Biggs was a member of the National Anti-Vaccination League. His anti-vaccination arguments were criticized in The Lancet journal over two decades. John Douglas Swales has described Biggs' book Sanitation Versus Vaccination as an "exhaustive 785 page volume of misplaced evangelical zeal".

Selected publications

Sanitation Versus Vaccination (London: National Anti-Vaccination League, 1912)

References

1847 births
1929 deaths
British anti-vaccination activists
Hygienists
People from Leicester